The Henry John Klutho House (also known as the Klutho Residence) is a historic home in Jacksonville, Florida. The house was designed and lived in by the New York City architect Henry John Klutho, who helped in the rebuilding of Jacksonville after the Great Fire of 1901. It is located at 28-30 West 9th Street. On December 19, 1978, it was added to the U.S. National Register of Historic Places.

References

External links

 Duval County listings at National Register of Historic Places
 Florida's Office of Cultural and Historical Programs
 Duval County listings
 Great Floridians of Jacksonville

Henry John Klutho buildings
Houses in Jacksonville, Florida
History of Jacksonville, Florida
National Register of Historic Places in Jacksonville, Florida
Laura Street